Lee Bo-young (born January 12, 1979) is a South Korean actress. She is best known for starring in the television dramas My Daughter Seo-young (2012), I Can Hear Your Voice (2013), Whisper (2017), Mother (2018), When My Love Blooms (2020), and Mine (2021). Lee was Gallup Korea's Television Actor of the Year in 2013.

Career
She began her career in the industry with winning the Daejeon entry for the Miss Korea beauty pageant in 2000. Having majored in Korean literature at Seoul Women's University, she originally dreamed of becoming a news presenter. She was one of 15 finalists in MBC's annual recruitment drive in 2002, but ended up not getting the job. Instead, she turned to modeling, and was chosen as the exclusive advertising model for Asiana Airlines, considered a gateway to stardom.

Lee made her acting debut in 2003, and among her early roles were in People of the Water Flower Village (2004) opposite Song Il-gook, and as the antagonist in Save the Last Dance for Me (2004).

In 2005, Lee played her first leading role in the daily drama My Sweetheart, My Darling, followed by the Silla-set historical epic Ballad of Seodong with Jo Hyun-jae. She spent the next several years in television dramas — Mr. Goodbye with Ahn Jae-wook, Queen of the Game with Joo Jin-mo, and Becoming a Billionaire with Ji Hyun-woo — but none struck a chord with audiences or critics.

After playing the love interest in My Brother (2004) and A Dirty Carnival (2006), Lee was cast in her first major big screen role in Once Upon a Time (2008). The heist comedy is set during colonial rule in the 1940s, and she and Park Yong-woo played notorious swindlers out to steal a diamond from the Japanese army.

Her two films released in 2009 were both melodramas. In More Than Blue, Lee plays the soulmate of a terminally ill man (Kwon Sang-woo), but their love ends in a tragedy undercut with a poetic sparseness. While in I Am Happy, Lee played a nurse who falls for a patient in the psychiatric ward (Hyun Bin), and in each other they find consolation to see them through their harsh and miserable reality.

Lee returned to television in 2010, playing a seductress in the quirky cable drama Golden House opposite Shin Ha-kyun. She then had a guest arc as the president's daughter in spy series Athena: Goddess of War, followed by post-divorce romance series Bravo, My Love! with Lee Tae-sung, and revenge drama Man from the Equator (2012) with Uhm Tae-woong.

She then played the titular character in My Daughter Seo-young, a career woman who is angry at her father (Chun Ho-jin), whose gambling addiction led to her mother's death, yet she struggles to keep the family together and make ends meet. Lee said playing Seo-young required a greater depth of emotion than any of her previous roles, which left her drained but also feeling a greater sense of achievement. The family drama was the biggest hit yet of Lee's career; it dominated the weekly ratings chart for 22 straight weeks, and recorded a series high of 47.6% on its last episode, the highest Korean drama rating in 2013.

Her follow-up series I Can Hear Your Voice (2013) was also popular during its run. In it, Lee played a materialistic public defender who testified on behalf of a boy with supernatural abilities (Lee Jong-suk) a decade ago after she witnessed the boy's father being murdered. Critics said with her stubborn and argumentative character, Lee was able to break free of her previous calm and elegant image. She won several awards for her performance, including the Daesang ("Grand Prize"), the highest honor at the SBS Drama Awards. Lee was selected as Gallup Korea's Television Actor of the Year in 2013.

In 2014, Lee played a mother who travels back in time two weeks before her daughter's kidnapping and murder in God's Gift - 14 Days. In 2017, Lee starred in SBS legal thriller Whisper, playing the role of a section chief of criminal division who gets dismissed from the police and later on disguise herself and work as an undercover at a law firm.

In 2018, Lee played the titular character in the tvN drama Mother adopted the Japanese television series of the same name. She then starred in the melodrama When My Love Blooms in 2020 and black comedy Mine in 2022.

Other activities
Lee is active in environmental causes, including the United Nations Convention to Combat Desertification. She and husband Ji Sung also makes donations to charitable causes regularly.

While on acting hiatus in 2015 during her pregnancy, she published the book Time of Love, a collection of essays on 23 books with themes of love, consolation and growth that have impacted Lee throughout her childhood and adulthood; they include The Little Prince, José Mauro de Vasconcelos's My Sweet Orange Tree, and Alain de Botton's Essays in Love.

Lee was confirmed to host 2017 SBS Drama Awards together with Shin Dong-yup. Previously, Lee has emceed the same award ceremony in 2013 together with Lee Hwi-jae and Kim Woo-bin.

In February 2023, Lee hosted the Accompanying charity concert to support children Ukrainians oppressed by the ongoing war.

Personal life

Dating and marriage 
Lee met actor Ji Sung on the set of 2004 TV series Save Last Dance for Me, and they confirmed their relationship in 2007. On August 2, 2013, they announced their engagement by uploading handwritten letters on their respective official fan sites. They married at Aston House, W Seoul Walkerhill Hotel on September 27, 2013. Their first child, daughter Kwak Ji-yoo was born on June 13, 2015. Their second child, a son named Kwak Woo-sung, was born on February 5, 2019.

Philanthropy 
In 2015, Lee donated 100 million won to the Children's Cancer Center at Seoul National University Hospital.

Filmography

Film

Television series

Television shows

Music video appearances

Awards and nominations

References

External links

 Lee Bo-young at J.Wide-Company 

South Korean television actresses
South Korean film actresses
Miss Korea delegates
1979 births
Living people
Seoul Women's University alumni
Best Actress Paeksang Arts Award (television) winners